Jonas Iversby Hvideberg (born 9 February 1999) is a Norwegian professional road racing cyclist, who currently rides for UCI WorldTeam .

Major results

2017
 1st  Points classification Trofeo Karlsberg
 3rd Overall Internationale Niedersachsen–Rundfahrt
1st Stage 1
 5th Paris–Roubaix Juniors
2019
 3rd Paris–Tours Espoirs
 10th Paris–Roubaix Espoirs
2020
 1st  Road race, UEC European Under-23 Road Championships
 2nd Road race, National Road Championships
 10th UCI Esports World Championships
2021
 1st Paris–Tours Espoirs
 8th Boucles de l'Aulne
 9th Overall Grand Prix Priessnitz spa

Grand Tour general classification results timeline

References

External links
 

1999 births
Living people
Norwegian male cyclists
Sportspeople from Fredrikstad